We Are Legends is the sixth album released by rap group, Partners-N-Crime.

Track listing
"Intro"
"Thang Thang" (feat. Youngin')
"Hood Shit" (feat. Skip)
"Move Around"
"A.O."
"So Good" (feat. NaTee)
"So Attracted" (feat. 5th Ward Webbie)
"You"
"Never Change" (feat. Jay Da Menace)
"Young'n (Skit)"
"Booty Loose" (feat. Impress)
"Miss Linda (Skit)"
"Squally"
"Diamonds" (feat. S-80)
"Move With Me" (feat. Sean C.)
"We Do What We Want To" (feat. Skip & Dangerfield)
"I'm Bout Dat" (feat. Jay Da Menace)
"Lose Control" (feat. S-80)

2009 albums
Partners-N-Crime albums